Maria de Fátima Agra (born 1952) is a Brazilian botanist and associate professor at the Universidade Federal da Paraíba (UFPB), in João Pessoa, Paraíba, Brazil. Agra specializes in ethnobotany, pharmacognosy, and plant morphology, particularly pertaining to plants of the family Solanaceae in northeastern Brazil.

Biography

Agra earned an undergraduate degree in Pharmaceutical Sciences from the Federal University of Paraíba (1977), a master's degree in botany from the Federal University of Pernambuco (1991), and a doctorate in Biological Sciences (specializing in botany) from the University of São Paulo (2001). She chairs the Postgraduate Program in Natural Products and Bioactive Synthetics at the UFPB. She is a founding editor of the Revista UNIPLAC and a member of the Botanical Society of Brazil (Sociedade Botânica do Brasil), of which she served as vice president in 2001.

Agra has published and served as a peer reviewer extensively in various languages, including the scholarly journals Rodriguésia, Novon, Journal of Ethnopharmacology, Annals of Tropical Medicine & Parasitology, Pharmaceutical Biology, and the European Journal of Pharmacology. According to Google Scholar, Agra's h-index is 32, and researchers have cited her work more than 5,100 times.

Under the author abbreviation "Agra," she has described sixteen plant species.

References

External links

 
 Institutional profile

20th-century Brazilian botanists
Brazilian women scientists
Brazilian women academics
Living people
Women botanists
Taxon authorities
Ethnobotanists
1952 births
Academic staff of the Federal University of Paraíba